Ian Blakemore (born 13 May 1965 in Ironbridge, Shropshire) was an English cricketer. He was a left-handed batsman and left-arm slow bowler who played for Herefordshire.

Blakemore, who made his cricketing debut in 1983 for Glamorgan Under-25s, and who appeared occasionally for Glamorgan's Second XI, made a single List A appearance for Herefordshire during the 1997 season. He scored 7 runs and bowled two overs, taking bowling figures of 0–19.

His son, Curtis Blakemore, also plays cricket.

References

External links
 Ian Blakemore at Cricinfo
Ian Blakemore at Cricket Archive 

1965 births
Living people
English cricketers
Herefordshire cricketers
People from Ironbridge